Tatenhill is an ancient village and a civil parish located in a deep valley, between two hills, which gradually descend from the eastern border of Needwood Forest,  west-southwest of Burton upon Trent, Staffordshire, England.

Buildings
The sandstone Parish Church of St. Michael is a 13th-century building which was substantially enlarged and altered in the 15th century. Around 1890, Bodley restored the church. It is a Grade II* listed building.

Beside the church stands the Old Rectory which was built in the early 18th century (1704 has been found written on the plaster inside the house) for William Binckes, Dean of Lichfield. Noted for its fine Georgian architecture is also a Grade II* listed building. In 2008, this house was one of four finalists in the "England's Finest Parsonage" contest featured in Country Life (magazine).

RAF Tatenhill is an old World War II airfield, still in use for light aircraft as Tatenhill Airfield. On 16 December 2007, there was a light aircraft collision involving an aircraft from Tatenhill.

Notable people  
 Brutus Babington (1558-1611) Rector of Tatenhill from 1602 and became the Church of Ireland Bishop of Derry.
 Charles Abraham (1814–1903) Rector of Tatenhill 1875-6 became the first Anglican Bishop of Wellington.

See also
Listed buildings in Tatenhill

References

External links 

GENUKI(tm) page
Adrian Saravia Rector Of Tatenhill
The Old Rectory, Tatenhill
"England's Finest Parsonages—The Finalists" including Tatenhill
Country Life Picture Library—The Old Rectory, Tatenhill

Villages in Staffordshire
Borough of East Staffordshire